Bodo Parja or Jharia is a dialect of Odia spoken by the Parang Proja tribe of southern Odisha. Most speakers have low proficiency in it, while Desia Odia is used at market.

References

Eastern Indo-Aryan languages
Languages of Odisha
Odia language